The Silver Hugo Award for Best Actress is one of the awards presented annually by the Chicago International Film Festival to recognize an actress who has delivered an outstanding performance. The jury chooses the winner from the films competing at the festival. It was first awarded in 1967.

List of winners

See also
Chicago International Film Festival

References

External links
 Chicago International Film Festival
 IMDb

Film awards for lead actress
Lists of films by award